The Masters Doubles WCT is a defunct WCT Tour affiliated men's tennis doubles tournament played from 1973 to 1986.  It was held in various locations and was played on indoor carpet courts.

Finals

See also
 WCT Finals

References
 ATP Results Archive

Tennis tournaments in Canada
Tennis tournaments in Mexico
Defunct tennis tournaments
Tennis tournaments in England
Defunct tennis tournaments in the United Kingdom
World Championship Tennis
 
Tennis tournaments in the United States
Carpet court tennis tournaments